Bananas is the 17th studio album by English rock band Deep Purple, released on 25 August 2003 via EMI Records and on 7 October 2003 via Sanctuary Records in the US. It is the first album to feature Don Airey on organ and keyboards, replacing founding member Jon Lord.

Overview
The album was recorded in Los Angeles during January and February 2003. It is also notable as being the first Ian Gillan-fronted Deep Purple album to make use of backing vocals other than Gillan's own (since the 1972 sessions for the song "Woman From Tokyo" in Germany which featured Jon Lord and Roger Glover singing backing vocals) with the song "Haunted" featuring Beth Hart. The album includes "Contact Lost", a short slow instrumental requiem for the Space Shuttle Columbia astronauts, written by guitarist Steve Morse when he heard the news of the crash.

The photo in the album cover was taken by the band's manager Bruce Payne. Although the music on the album is considered good, the cover has made many online lists of worst album covers. 

Bananas charted well despite lack of media exposure, especially in Europe and South America (notably at Germany and Argentina where it peaked in the top 10).

Unreleased tracks
Since the Abandon album, Deep Purple performed three new songs onstage. "Long Time Gone" was debuted in the summer of 2000 but not included on Bananas.  Another new song, "Up The Wall" was played on the 2002 UK tour and reworked into "I Got Your Number". The instrumental "Well Dressed Guitar" remained unreleased until the next album, 2005's Rapture of the Deep.

Track listing

Personnel 
Deep Purple
 Ian Gillan – vocals
 Steve Morse – guitars
 Roger Glover – bass
 Don Airey – keyboards
 Ian Paice – drums

Additional musicians
 Paul Buckmaster – string arrangement and cello on "Haunted"
 Beth Hart – backing vocals on "Haunted"
 Michael Bradford – guitar on "Walk On"

Production
Michael Bradford - producer, engineer
Chris Wonzer - assistant engineer
Andy Vandette - mastering at Masterdisk, New York

Charts

Certifications

References 

Deep Purple albums
2003 albums
EMI Records albums
Sanctuary Records albums
Albums produced by Michael Bradford